The Clipper Round the World Yacht Race was conceived in 1995 by Sir Robin Knox-Johnston and together with William Ward (CEO), founded Clipper Ventures, a company that would run the race. The race takes paying amateur crews on one or more legs of a circumnavigation of the globe in specially designed yachts owned by Clipper Ventures. Three different classes of yacht have been used throughout the race, the Clipper 60, Clipper 68 and Clipper 70s. The race ran every two years between 1996 and 2002, and then skipped a year, with subsequent races beginning in 2005, 2007, 2009, 2013, 2015 and 2017.

Clipper 1996

Route 

The first race took a route starting from Plymouth and then sailing to Madeira, Fort Lauderdale, Panama, Galapagos, Hawaii, Yokohama, Shanghai, Hong Kong, Singapore, Seychelles, Durban, Cape Town, Salvador (Brazil), the Azores and back to Plymouth.

Results 

The overall scores were calculated based on the number of points awarded for each race, with first place scoring one point, second scoring two points and so on.

Clipper 1998

Fleet 

Seven boats raced, with Blackadder not competing.

Route 

The route was largely the same as the '96 race, but called briefly at Nassau in the Bahamas before going to Marina Hemingway, five miles to the west of Havana, a direct course between the USA and Cuba being impossible.

Results 

The race was won, convincingly, by Alex Thomson, who was the youngest skipper to win a round the world yacht race at just 24. Thomson used the win to springboard him into the international racing scene on his Open 60 Hugo Boss.

The Times Clipper 2000 Race 

This was the only race to have a title sponsor, with the UK daily broadsheet The Times sponsoring the race and trophy.

Fleet 

All eight Clipper 60 yachts took part, and were renamed after cities in the UK (Portsmouth, Plymouth, Bristol, Glasgow, Leeds, London, Jersey and Liverpool), with the crews, where possible, drawn from the city their boat was named for.

Route 

The race started and finished in Portsmouth harbour. The stop in the Azores was replaced by one in New York City and to compensate for the extra distance the Seychelles to Durban to Cape Town leg was reduced to Mauritius to Cape Town.

The race attempted to make it from Yokohama to Shanghai but a fierce storm east of Tokyo Bay in March 2001 caused damage to several of the boats and by the time they had returned to Japan for repair, the entry visas to China had lapsed. Instead, the fleet raced from Yokohama to Naha, the capital of the Japanese island, Okinawa.

Another diversion took place in May 2001 when mechanical problems to Bristol Clipper’s generator meant the fleet spent two days in Christmas Island and the crews got an unexpected Australian stamp in their passports.

In another modification to the Clipper ‘96 and Clipper ‘98 route, stops were included in Vilamoura (Portugal), Singapore and Mauritius with the penultimate race going from New York to the Channel Island port of St. Helier.

Results 

The point scoring method was altered, with the races now scoring 8 points for a win, 7 for second and so on.

Clipper 2002-03 Race

Fleet 

This was to be the fourth and final circumnavigation for the Clipper 60 fleet. Three of the boats were renamed, and international cities were now added to the race, Hong Kong, Cape Town and New York.

Route 

The start point was moved to Liverpool, and an estimated 40,000 spectators came to see the boats off despite a 24-hour delay due to storms in the Irish Sea.  gusts turned the local waters into a boiling maelstrom and the start was postponed from the Sunday until the next day.

The race continued to go westwards. As in 2000, the attempt to race into Shanghai failed – this time thanks to the promised berthing facilities being withdrawn. Further along the route, the fleet was challenged by the SARS virus and the yachts were forced to find an alternative location close to Singapore. The popular Indonesian island of Batam provided the facilities and the stop proved so popular, it was a catalyst for Singapore to enter a yacht in the next running of the race.

Results

Clipper 2005–06 Race

Fleet 

The 2005 race was the first to feature the larger Clipper 68 yachts.

After the initial three international boats from the 2002 race, the race was made fully international, with boats sponsored by Victoria, British Columbia, Canada, Qingdao, Durban, New York City, Singapore and Western Australia as well as the home teams of Liverpool, Glasgow, Cardiff and Jersey.

Route 

The 2005 race was the first to circumnavigate from east to west. The route was altered to take account of the faster boats, and to take in stopovers at many of the sponsoring cities. For the first time there was a leg across the Southern Ocean between Durban and Fremantle, and a leg across the North Pacific between Qingdao and Victoria, British Columbia, Canada.

The race schedule was significantly altered when Glasgow Clipper reported keel problems in the South China Sea, and diverted to Subic Bay in the Philippines, followed by the rest of the fleet that were showing symptoms, causing an enforced 6 week stopover. The revised schedule dropped the planned stopover in Yokohama from the route, and moved the Caribbean stopover from Curaçao to Jamaica.

Results 

Races score first = 10 points, second = 9 points, etc. However, Race 1 (Liverpool to Cascais) and Race 13 (Holyhead to Liverpool) were scored at half points. In addition, the race committee did sometimes apply points penalties, invariably for excessive sail damage. The penalty points are shown in brackets after the result.

The original race 6, from Singapore to Qingdao was abandoned when the fleet diverted to Subic, and no points were awarded.

Liverpool and Singapore were awarded a tie in Race 3, after Liverpool had a GPS failure, and could not confirm its finish time with sufficient accuracy to determine whether it was ahead or behind Singapore. 5.5 points were awarded to each boat.

Clipper 2007–08 Race 

The Clipper 07–08 race started on 16 September 2007 in Liverpool.

Fleet 

Once again, 10 Clipper 68s took part. There were some changes to the lineup with Victoria, Jersey and Cardiff replaced by Jamaica, Hull & Humber and Nova Scotia.

Route 

The race had some changes compared to the 05–06 route. La Rochelle was the first stop, replacing Cascais, and the route for Leg 5 changed, with the race leaving Qingdao and heading to Santa Cruz, California via Hawaii, eliminating the stopovers in Yokohama and Victoria. The final leg also changed, with an extra stop in Halifax, and the final pitstop in Cork, rather than Jersey and then finished in Liverpool in July 2008.

Results 

 In Race 3, Hull and Humber crossed the line first, but had a four-hour penalty applied for using her motor during a casualty evacuation near the start of the race. As New York were six minutes behind, and Liverpool and Glasgow also finished within four hours, Hull and Humber dropped to fourth place in that race.
 In Race 8, Western Australia and Durban did not compete after losing their masts in Race 7. The race committee awarded them points for the race based on their average position in races 1–7. Durban got 7 points, Western Australia got 5.

RTD = Retired,
DNC = Did not compete

Where two teams are equal on points, their relative position is determined using the countback rule. That is, the team with the most first-place finishes is placed higher; if those are equal, look at second-place finishes, and so forth.

Points have been deducted for sail damage: Glasgow & Hull and Humber 4, Nova Scotia & Jamaica 3, Liverpool 1.

Race 1 was for half points.

Clipper 2009–10 Race 

The Clipper 2009–10 race started from Kingston upon Hull on the Humber Estuary on 13 September 2009.   The race was won by Spirit of Australia on 17 July 2010, when the yachts returned to Hull Marina for a gala celebration.

Fleet 

The same fleet of Clipper 68s took part. The yachts were named Hull and Humber, Qingdao, Uniquely Singapore, Cape Breton Island, Spirit of Australia, California, Edinburgh Inspiring Capital, Jamaica Lightning Bolt, Team Finland and Cork.

The crew successfully evacuated the yacht and were aided by competitors Team California and Team Finland. Cork Clipper was abandoned a few days later after the decision was made that any attempt to salvage her would be uneconomical. A Challenge 67' yacht Aurora of London was chartered and prepared and re-branded as Cork in Antigua. She rejoined the race in Panama in May 2010, where she was skippered by Hannah Jenner - former 07/08 skipper of Glasgow - Scotland With Style. The Cork yacht was able to finish the race in style as they achieved line honours into their home port of Kinsale, and won the final race from IJmuiden to Hull; winning a second coveted yellow pennant.

Results 

For this race, stealth mode was introduced along with scoring gates.

Clipper 2011-12 Race 

The fleet departed from Ocean Village on 31 July 2011 and the race started in the Solent. The race lasted a full year and covered an estimated .

Fleet 
In this edition of the race the fleet included a newly built Clipper 68 to replace the yacht lost at sea.  The race saw several yachts suffering steering gear failures, the most severe causing Singapore to retire during the leg to New Zealand. During race 9 from Qingdao to California, an incident on the Geraldton Western Australia yacht made international headlines when the US Coastguard Cutter Bertholf rescued two of the four injured crew from the yacht.

Route 

The route was again modified with yachts visiting Eastern Australia and New Zealand for the first time before sailing up to Singapore.

Results 

Scoring gates and stealth mode were again features of the 11-12 race.

Clipper 2013-14 Race

Fleet 
For this edition, the fleet was expanded to 12 brand new identical Tony Castro designed Clipper 70 yachts. In a break from tradition, 5 of the yachts are sponsored by companies rather than cities or countries.

Route 
The race set off from London's St. Katherine Docks on Sunday 1 September, with the start taking place offshore at Southend the following morning. The fleet then raced to Brest and onwards to Rio de Janeiro, Cape Town, Albany, Sydney, Hobart, Brisbane, Singapore, Qingdao, San Francisco, Panama, Jamaica, New York, Derry/Londonderry, and Den Helder, before finishing back in London.

Skippers 
On 10 April 2013, the skippers for the Clipper 13-14 Round the World Yacht Race were announced as follows:

Clipper 13-14 Results

Clipper 2015-16 Race

Fleet 
The 2015-16 edition of the race featured the same matched fleet of twelve Clipper 70 yachts as took part in the 2013-14 Race. GREAT Britain, Derry-Londonderry-Doire and Qingdao return as sponsors, with other the sponsors announced during 2015 being (in order of announcement): ClipperTelemed+, Mission Performance, Unicef, IchorCoal, Garmin, Da Nang - Viet Nam, LMAX Exchange, PSP Logistics, and Visit Seattle.

Route 
The 2015-16 edition of the race set sail on Sunday 30 August 2015, once again from London's St Katharine Docks, with the actual start of the first race taking place offshore at Southend at 1230 BST on Monday 31 August. The fleet will race to Rio de Janeiro, Cape Town, Albany, Sydney, Hobart, the Whitsunday Islands, Da Nang, Qingdao, Seattle, Panama, New York, Derry/Londonderry, and Den Helder, before finishing back in London.

Skippers 
On 18 March 2015, the skippers for the Clipper 15-16 Round the World Yacht Race were announced as follows:

Results
On 29 July 2016, the winners of the Clipper 2015-16 Round the World Yacht Race were announced as follows:

Clipper 2017-18 Race

Fleet 
The 2017-18 edition of the race featured the same matched fleet of twelve Clipper 70 yachts as took part in the 2015-16 Race. CV24, Greenings, retired from the race entirely when it ran aground on October 31, 2017 off the coast of Cape Town.

Route 
The 2017-18 edition of the race set sail on Sunday 20 August 2017, Liverpool’s Albert Dock. This was the fourth time Liverpool has hosted the Clipper race, making it the most frequented Clipper Race stopover port. The fleet raced to Punta del Este, Cape Town, Freemantle, Sydney, Hobart, the Whitsunday Islands, Sanya, Qingdao, Seattle, Panama, New York, Derry/Londonderry, before finishing back in Liverpool on Saturday, July 28, 2018.

Results 

The race was won by Wendy Tuck, who was the first female skipper to win a round the world yacht race. In second place came Nikki Henderson, to date the youngest skipper of the Clipper Round the World Yacht Race.

The results of the Clipper 2017-18 Round the World Yacht Race were announced as follows:

Clipper 2019-20 Race

Route 

The race started at London and continued to Portimao, Punta del Este, Cape Town, Fremantle, Whitsundays and Subic Bay. The COVID-19 pandemic forced the organisers to cancel visits to Chinese ports and suspend the remaining legs. The race resumed in March 2022, when the sailors parted from Subic Bay and travelled to Seattle, Panama, Bermuda, New York, Derry and finally back to London.

Results

References

External links 

www.clipperroundtheworld.com Clipper Race Official Website
www.clipper-ventures.com Clipper Ventures Plc Official Website

Round-the-world sailing competitions
Yachting races